Rashida is a village in Chiniot District in Punjab, Pakistan. It is located on Jhang-Chiniot road with an approximate population of 2,000.

Villages in Chiniot District